Kauko Mikael Tamminen (14 September 1920 - 29 November 1989) was a Finnish paper mill worker and politician, born in Sääksmäki. He was a member of the Parliament of Finland from 1958 to 1966 and again from 1967 to 1983, representing the Finnish People's Democratic League (SKDL).

References

1920 births
1989 deaths
People from Valkeakoski
Finnish People's Democratic League politicians
Members of the Parliament of Finland (1958–62)
Members of the Parliament of Finland (1962–66)
Members of the Parliament of Finland (1966–70)
Members of the Parliament of Finland (1970–72)
Members of the Parliament of Finland (1972–75)
Members of the Parliament of Finland (1975–79)
Members of the Parliament of Finland (1979–83)